Tamnay-en-Bazois is a commune in the Nièvre department in central France.

See also
Communes of the Nièvre department

References

Communes of Nièvre
Nièvre communes articles needing translation from French Wikipedia